Puri Indah is a growing neighborhood at  Kembangan, Jakarta, Indonesia. The area is in between South Kembangan and North Meruya administrative village of Kembangan district of West Jakarta. The area is located at the intersection of  W1-W2  toll/expressway of the Jakarta Outer Ring Road.

The area is one of the rapidly growing neighborhoods which consists of business districts, apartment towers and shopping centers with other civic amenities. Because of its strategic location and close proximity to both Soekarno-Hatta International Airport and Port of Tanjung Priok, the area has already turned into a new central business district of Jakarta.

Block
Most of the renowned developers of Indonesia are constructing separate block developments within the area.

Puri Indah CBD
Puri Indah area is a  CBD area that will consist of five-star hotels, apartments, suites office towers, convention & exhibition center, international hospital and luxury shopping malls. It has been developing and maintained by Pondok Indah Group for about 20 years.

St. Moritz
The six apartment towers and Lippo Office Tower are integrated with Lippo Mall Puri.

Ciputra
This super block consists of 10 towers of office, apartments and shopping mall.

Important landmarks
Lippo Mall Puri
Px Pavilion
Lippo Office Tower
Puri Indah Mall
Puri Indah Financial Tower
Pondok Indah Puri Indah Hospital
IPEKA School
Springfield International School
Notre Dame International School

Transportation

Toll Road Access

See also

St. Moritz, Jakarta

References

West Jakarta
Geography of Jakarta
Central business districts in Indonesia